Fateh Ali Khan Jullundhri Qawwal (1901  1964) was a classical singer and a qawwali musician in the 1940s and 1950s. 

He was born in Jullundur, Punjab, British India in 1901. Fateh Ali Khan was the father of Pakistani Qawwali musicians, Nusrat Fateh Ali Khan and Farrukh Fateh Ali Khan. Their family has an unbroken tradition of Qawwali, linked closely to the Sufi Chishti Order for over 600 years.

Biography

Training 
Fateh Ali Khan was trained in classical music and Qawwali by his father, Maula Baksh Khan (Ali Khan), and he, soon after his training, distinguished himself as a skilled vocalist and instrumentalist. He learned to play traditional Indian instruments such as sitar, sarod and vichitraveena as well as Western instruments like the violin. He also mastered thousands of verses in Punjabi, Urdu, Arabic and Persian.

Leader of Qawwali Party 
Fateh Ali Khan was the leader of his family's Qawwali party but they were billed as Fateh Ali Khan, Mubarak Ali Khan & Party. Mubarak Ali Khan, his brother, shared both singing and harmonium-playing duties with him. They were regarded as among the foremost exponents of Qawwali in their time. They are credited with popularizing the poetry of Allama Iqbal through their singing. 

Allama Iqbal's poetry was regarded as difficult to set musical tunes to, and while he was highly admired in academic circles and by intellectuals, Allama Iqbal did not have much of a popular following yet among the common people mainly due to the radio broadcasting technology still under development back then in British India. Fateh Ali Khan and Mubarak Ali Khan, more than anyone else, helped Iqbal achieve popular success as well:

Legacy 
In 1948, his son, Nusrat, was born in Faisalabad, Pakistan. Fateh Ali Khan wanted Nusrat to become a doctor or an engineer because he felt Qawwali artists had low social status. However, Nusrat showed such interest in and aptitude for Qawwali that his father soon relented, and began training him. However, Fateh Ali Khan died in 1964 at the age of sixty-three, when Nusrat was sixteen and still in school. Nusrat's training was completed by Fateh Ali Khan's brothers, Mubarak Ali Khan and Salamat Ali Khan. Nusrat Fateh Ali Khan went on to become a household name and widely respected as the greatest exponent of Qawwali.

Awards and recognition
Pride of Performance Award in 1960 by the President of Pakistan.

See also
 List of Pakistani qawwali singers

References 

1901 births
1964 deaths
Singers from Faisalabad
20th-century Pakistani male singers
Pakistani qawwali singers
Pakistani musicologists
Recipients of the Pride of Performance
20th-century Indian male singers
20th-century Indian singers
People from Jalandhar
Punjabi people
Fateh Ali Khan family
20th-century musicologists